The 1970 ECAC Hockey Men's Ice Hockey Tournament was the 9th tournament in league history. It was played between March 10 and March 14, 1970. Quarterfinal games were played at home team campus sites, while the 'final four' games were played at the Boston Garden in Boston, Massachusetts. By reaching the championship game both, Cornell and Clarkson received invitations to participate in the 1970 NCAA University Division Men's Ice Hockey Tournament.

Format
The tournament featured three rounds of play, all of which were single-elimination. The top eight teams, based on conference rankings, qualified to participate in the tournament. In the quarterfinals the first seed and eighth seed, the second seed and seventh seed, the third seed and sixth seed and the fourth seed and fifth seed played against one another. In the semifinals, the highest seed plays the lowest remaining seed while the two remaining teams play with the winners advancing to the championship game and the losers advancing to the third place game.

Conference standings
Note: GP = Games played; W = Wins; L = Losses; T = Ties; Pct. = Winning percentage; GF = Goals for; GA = Goals against

Bracket
Teams are reseeded after the first round

Note: * denotes overtime period(s)

Quarterfinals

(1) Cornell vs. (8) St. Lawrence

(2) Clarkson vs. (7) Brown

(3) Boston University vs. (6) New Hampshire

(4) Boston College vs. (5) Harvard

Semifinals

(1) Cornell vs. (5) Harvard

(2) Clarkson vs. (3) Boston University

Third Place

(3) Boston University vs. (5) Harvard

Championship

(1) Cornell vs. (2) Clarkson

Tournament awards

All-Tournament Team

First Team
F Joe Cavanagh* (Harvard)
F Kevin Pettit (Cornell)
F Dick Toomey (Boston University)
D Dan Lodboa (Cornell)
D Steve Warr (Clarkson)
G Bruce Bullock (Clarkson)
* Most Outstanding Player(s)

Second Team
F George McManama (Harvard)
F John Halme (Clarkson)
F Larry Davenport (Boston University)
D Wayne LaChance (Clarkson)
D Mike Hyndman (Boston University)
G Bruce Durno (Harvard)
G Brian Cropper (Cornell)

References

External links
ECAC Hockey
1969–70 ECAC Hockey Standings
1969–70 NCAA Standings

ECAC Hockey Men's Ice Hockey Tournament
ECAC tournament